In mathematics, in the area of abstract algebra known as group theory, a verbal subgroup is a subgroup of a group that is generated by all elements that can be formed by substituting group elements for variables in a given set of words. 

For example, given the word xy, the corresponding verbal subgroup is generated by the set of all products of two elements in the group, substituting any element for x and any element for y, and hence would be the group itself. On the other hand, the verbal subgroup for the set of words  is generated by the set of squares and their conjugates. Verbal subgroups are the only fully characteristic subgroups of a free group and therefore represent the generic example of fully characteristic subgroups, .

References 
 

Infinite group theory
Subgroup properties